The Pont Rouelle (English: Rouelle Bridge) is a railway bridge in Paris that crosses the river Seine. It connects the city's 15th and 16th arrondissements, and passes through the Île aux Cygnes. Constructed of steel, the bridge is 173 metres (567 feet) long and 20 metres (66 feet) wide. It is currently used for railway service, carrying the RER C.

Structure
It is composed of four distinct portions:
 On the Right Bank, an arch in masonry spans the bank road.
 The portion that spans the right arm of the Seine consists of a single metal arch.
 The part which crosses the Île aux Cygnes spans the island's pedestrian alley with a small stone arch.
 The part which spans the left arm of the river, reaching the Left Bank, rests on two piles in the Seine.

Gallery

Rouelle